Platydoris cinereobranchiata is a species of sea slug, a dorid nudibranch, shell-less marine opisthobranch gastropod mollusks in the family Discodorididae.

Distribution
This species was described from Anilao and Maricaban Island, Batangas, Luzon, Philippines. It was also reported from the Seychelles as Platydoris tabulata. Further distribution includes the Solomon Islands.

References

External links 
 

Discodorididae
Gastropods described in 2002